Milgrom is a surname derived from the Yiddish word for pomegranate (מילגרוים, Milgroim) and may refer to:

 Allen "Al" Milgrom (born 1950), American comic book writer
 Felix Milgrom (1919-2007), Jewish Polish-American microbiologist
 Jacob Milgrom (1923-2010), Jewish Biblical scholar
 Lionel Milgrom, British chemist and homeopath
 Marcia Milgrom Dodge, an American director, choreographer and writer
 Mordehai Milgrom (born 1946), Israeli physicist
 Naomi Milgrom, Australian business owner
 Paul Milgrom (born 1948), American economist

See also 
 Milgram

Yiddish-language surnames
Jewish surnames